The horned sungem (Heliactin bilophus) is a species of hummingbird in the subfamily Polytminae, the mangoes. It occurs in Bolivia, Brazil, and Suriname.

Taxonomy and systematics

The horned sungem is the only member of its genus and has no subspecies. The scientific name Heliactin cornutus has sometimes been used for the species, but H. bilophus has priority. The specific epithet bilophus, rather than bilopha or bilophum, is correct despite the mismatch between its apparently masculine Latin ending and the feminine one of the genus.

Description

The male is "dazzlingly adorned", with red, blue, and gold feather tufts ("horns") above the eyes. Its crown is a shiny dark blue and its back and rump bronzy green. The central pair of tail feathers are green and the rest white; the two innermost pairs are very long. The throat, upper breast, and much of the face are black while the neck and belly are white. The female is plainer, without the "horns" or the male's black of the throat, breast, and face.

Distribution and habitat

The horned sungem is found across much of central Brazil, in the east from southern Maranhão south to São Paulo (state) and then west to western Mato Grosso and into Bolivia's Santa Cruz department. It is also found in a small area of southern Suriname and another in the northern Brazilian state of Amapá, and has been reported outside of its normal range in far western Brazil. It inhabits a variety of semi-open to open landscapes such as gallery forest, woodland, cerrado, grassland, and gardens.

Behavior

Movement

The horned sungem is migratory in parts of central and eastern Brazil, where it moves in response to the seasonal flowering of some plants. Though its movement pattern in the southern part of its range is not known in detail, it appears to be sedentary there.

Feeding

The horned sungem feeds on nectar from a variety of flowering bushes and trees, foraging up to the middle strata of its habitat. It also takes small insects by "hawking" from a perch and sometimes directly from vegetation.

Breeding

The horned sungem's breeding season is mostly from June to October but starts as early as April in some areas. The female alone builds the nest, incubates the eggs, and cares for the young. It makes a tiny cup nest of soft material and spider web decorated with lichen on its outside. The clutch size is two eggs. The incubation time is about 13 days with fledging 20 to 22 days after hatch.

Vocalization

During chases, the horned sungem makes a "complex twittering comprising squeaky, burry and buzzy notes". Its calls include "a repeated 'tsit' or 'tseet'."

Status

The IUCN has assessed the horned sungem as being of Least Concern. Though its population size is not known it is believed to be increasing. It is locally common, occurs in several protected areas, and uses human-made habitats such as gardens. It also appears to be expanding its range.

References

External links
Mangoverde.com page with photos
Another page with photos
Stamps (for Brazil)
Horned Sungem photo gallery VIREO 

Trochilinae
Birds of the Cerrado
Birds of the Pantanal
Birds of the Caatinga
Birds of Brazil
Birds of Bolivia
Birds of the Guianas
Hummingbird species of South America
Birds described in 1820
Taxa named by Coenraad Jacob Temminck